J. Clark Salyer National Wildlife Refuge is located along the Souris River in Bottineau and McHenry Counties in north-central North Dakota. The area is old lake bottom and has extremely flat topography and a high density of temporary wetlands.

The Souris River originates in southern Saskatchewan, flows southwest to Velva, North Dakota, and then generally north to join the Assiniboine River in southern Manitoba. Approximately  of the Souris River are within the boundaries of the Refuge.

The area was designated as the Lower Souris National Wildlife Refuge in 1935.  It was renamed to be the J. Clark Salyer National Wildlife Refuge in 1967 in honor of John Clark Salyer II, who was chief during 1934 to 1961 of the U.S. Fish and Wildlife Service's Division of Wildlife Refuges.

See also 
 Lower Souris National Wildlife Refuge Airplane Hangar

References
Refuge website

External links

National Wildlife Refuges in North Dakota
Protected areas of Bottineau County, North Dakota
Protected areas of McHenry County, North Dakota
Historic American Engineering Record in North Dakota
Wetlands of North Dakota
Landforms of Bottineau County, North Dakota
Landforms of McHenry County, North Dakota